Prayas Ray Barman (born 25 October 2002) is an Indian cricketer. He made his List A debut for Bengal in the 2018–19 Vijay Hazare Trophy on 20 September 2018. He was the leading wicket-taker for Bengal in the 2018–19 Vijay Hazare Trophy, with eleven dismissals in nine matches.

In December 2018, he was bought by the Royal Challengers Bangalore in the player auction for the 2019 Indian Premier League (IPL) for 1.5 crores. He made his Twenty20 debut for Bengal in the 2018–19 Syed Mushtaq Ali Trophy on 21 February 2019. On 31 March 2019, Barman made his debut for Royal Challengers Bangalore in the IPL against Sunrisers Hyderabad, becoming the youngest player to debut in the IPL. He was released by the Royal Challengers Bangalore ahead of the 2020 IPL auction.

References

External links
 

2002 births
Living people
Indian cricketers
Bengal cricketers